The Million Dollar Piano was a concert residency by British musician Elton John, which took place at The Colosseum at Caesars Palace in Las Vegas, Nevada, United States. It was John's second concert residency in Las Vegas after The Red Piano.

DVD release
The Million Dollar Piano was recorded in February 2012 at a sell out show at the Colosseum at Caesars Palace in Las Vegas. The film was broadcast to cinemas across the world in April 2014 before being released on home media on July 1, 2014. The Blu-ray and DVD both feature additional songs from John's tour in Kyiv. The set also features a behind-the-scenes look at 'The Making of The Million Dollar Piano'. Both the DVD and Blu-ray releases have been praised for their video and sound quality.

Set list
This set list is representative of most of the performances of the residency. 

"The Bitch Is Back"
"Bennie and the Jets"
"Rocket Man"
"Levon"
"Tiny Dancer"
"Your Song"
"Mona Lisas and Mad Hatters"
"Better Off Dead"
"Indian Sunset"
"Blue Eyes"
"Goodbye Yellow Brick Road"
"I Guess That's Why They Call It the Blues"
"Don't Let the Sun Go Down on Me"
"Philadelphia Freedom"
"I'm Still Standing"
"Crocodile Rock"
"Saturday Night's Alright for Fighting"
Encore
 "Circle of Life"

Residency dates

References

Concert residencies in the Las Vegas Valley
2011 concert residencies
2012 concert residencies
2013 concert residencies
2014 concert residencies
2015 concert residencies
2016 concert residencies
2017 concert residencies
2018 concert residencies
Elton John concert residencies
Caesars Palace